The Brnjica culture (full name: Donja Brnjica-Gornja Stražava cultural group) is an archaeological culture in present-day Kosovo and Serbia dating from 1400 BC.

Description

The cultural group formed out of this culture is the Thracian tribe of Moesi.
It is also the non-Illyrian component in the Dardanian ethnogenesis.

The culture is characterized by several groups:
 Kosovo with Raska and Pester
 South and West Morava confluence zone
 Leskovac-Nis
 South Morava-Pcinja-Upper Vardar

Brnjica type pottery has been found in Blageovgrad, Plovdiv, and a number of sites in Pelagonia, Lower Vardar, the island of Thasos and Thessaly dating to 13th and 12th century BC.

Sites

Donja Brnjica
The main site of the culture is a necropolis at Donja Brnjica, (Albanian: Bërnica e Poshtme) near Pristina.

Hisar

Hisar is a multi-periodal settlement at a hill near Leskovac.

Traces of life of the Brnjica culture (8th century BC) are seen in the plateau that was protected by a deep moat with a palisade on its inner side, a fortification similar to that of another fortification on the Gradac site in Lanište in the Velika Morava basin.

A later Iron Age settlement existed at Hisar dating from the 6th century BC until the 4th century BC. Besides Greek fibulae and pottery, Triballi (Thracian) tombs have been excavated in 2005.

References

See also
 Museum of Kosovo
 Kingdom of Dardania
 Archaeology of Kosovo
 Neolithic sites in Kosovo
 Roman heritage in Kosovo
 Copper, Bronze and Iron Age sites in Kosovo

Bronze Age cultures of Europe
Archaeological cultures of Southeastern Europe
Archaeological cultures in Greece
Archaeological cultures in Kosovo
Archaeological cultures in North Macedonia
Archaeological cultures in Serbia
Thracian archaeological cultures
Ancient tribes in Serbia
Bronze Age Serbia
Dacian archaeology
Moesia